Major General Fida Hussain Malik is a Pakistani two-star general who commanded 11th Infantry Division in Lahore.

In February 2014, he was promoted to the rank of major general. Major General Fida Hussain Malik was awarded Hilal-e-Imtiaz Military on 23 March 2018. Presently, the officer is appointed as Director General Defence Complex Islamabad and is due to retire on 12 February 2021

In 2016, he was named as the director-general Logistics at the GHQ.

References

Living people
Pakistani generals
Punjabi people
Year of birth missing (living people)